Võmmorski is a village in Setomaa Parish, Võru County, in southeastern Estonia, on the border with Russia. The Piusa River borders the village in the north, Russian border in the east. As of 2000, Võmmorski had a population of 43.

The Piusa cordon of Estonian Border Guard is located in Võmmorski.

On 4 May 2011 a shooting incident between police officers and local landowner took place just behind the river on the territory of Piusa village. As a result the landowner and a police officer died and two were wounded.

See also
Võmmorski old tsässon

References

Villages in Võru County